75 Livingston Street, also known as the Court Chambers Building, or the Brooklyn Chamber of Commerce Building, is a 30-story  residential cooperative tower located in Downtown Brooklyn, New York. The building was designed by architect Abraham J. Simberg, and built in 1926. The building was initially designed to have a dining room on the terrace of the 25th floor and to be 430 ft high (131 m).

At one time in the past, the structure was called the Court-Livingston, due to its alternate street address of 66 Court Street. Originally constructed as an office tower, the building was converted into cooperative apartments in 1981. In 2010 the building was included in the Borough Hall Skyscraper Historic District, which would landmark it, as well as several of the surrounding buildings. This inclusion came with disagreements from many residents of the building who claimed that, not only was the building's architecture not significant enough to merit landmark status, but also argued that the status would be financially adverse for those living in the building. However, the building was included in the Historic District and was landmarked in 2011.

See also
 List of tallest buildings in Brooklyn
 List of tallest buildings in New York City

References

External links

75 Livingston Street on CTBUH
75 Livingston Street on Emporis
75 Livingston Street on Skyscraperpage.com
75 Livingston Street on Structurae

1920s architecture in the United States
1926 establishments in New York City
Brooklyn Heights
Buildings and structures completed in 1926
Downtown Brooklyn
Gothic Revival architecture in New York City
Gothic Revival skyscrapers
Residential buildings in Brooklyn
Residential condominiums in New York City
Residential skyscrapers in New York City
Skyscrapers in Brooklyn